Lesnovo Airfield  is an airfield in Lesnovo, Bulgaria. It is located some 22 km east of Sofia in the municipality of Elin Pelin. Until 1989, Lesnovo's airfield served as an agricultural airport. In 2001, the airport became the property of Intersky. The asphalt runway was extended and expanded to reach the present size of 910x25 m. As of fall 2013, Lesnovo Airfield has three hangars, an air traffic control tower, a restaurant and a hotel. In 2011, the airfield registered over 5000 aircraft movements.

References

External links
 Photos capture on Lesnovo airfield

Airports in Bulgaria